The Roman Catholic Diocese of São Luíz de Cáceres is a suffragan Latin diocese in the Ecclesiastical province of the Metropolitan Cuiabá in Mato Grosso state, western central Brazil.

Its cathedral episcopal see is Catedral São Luiz de França, dedicated to Saint King Louis IX of France, in the city of Cáceres.

History 
 Established on April 5, 1910 as Diocese of São Luíz de Cáceres, without missionary stage, on territory split off from its Metropolitan, the Archdiocese of Cuiaba
 Lost territories twice : on 1925.05.01 to establish the Territorial Prelature of Porto Velho and on 1929.03.01 to establish the Territorial Prelature of Guajará-Mirim

Statistics 
As per 2014, it pastorally served 351,000 Catholics (78.2% of 449,000 total) on 135,969 km² in 23 parishes with 42 priests (25 diocesan, 17 religious), 1 deacon, 75 lay religious (23 brothers, 52 sisters) and 16 seminarians.

Bishops
(all Roman rite)

Episcopal ordinaries

Suffragan Bishops of São Luíz de Cáceres
 Modesto Augusto Vieira (born Brazil) (1911.05.12 – 1914.01.12), next Titular Bishop of Archelaïs (1914.01.12 – 1916.09.27) as Auxiliary Bishop of Mariana (Brazil) (1914.01.12 – death 1916.09.27)
 Pedro Luis Maria Galibert, Third Order Regular of St. Francis of Penance (T.O.R.) (born France) (1915.03.13 – retired 1954.04.27), emeritate as Titular Bishop of Platæa (1954.04.27 – death 1965.12.24)
 Apostolic Administrator Father Máximo André Biennès, T.O.R. (born France) (1955 – 1967.11.03 see below), without previous prelature
 Máximo André Biennès, T.O.R. (see above 1967.11.03 – retired 1991.07.24), died 2007
 Auxiliary Bishop: José Afonso Ribeiro, T.O.R. (born Brazil) (1979.01.29 – 1988.07.06), Titular Bishop of Bagis (1979.01.29 – 1988.07.06); later second Bishop-Prelate of Territorial Prelature of Borba (Brazil) (1988.07.06 – retired 2006.05.03), died 2009
 Paulo Antônio de Conto (born Brazil) (1991.07.24 – 1998.05.27), next Bishop of Criciúma (Brazil) (1998.05.27 – 2008.07.02), Bishop of Montenegro (Brazil) (2008.07.02 – ...), Apostolic Administrator of Archdiocese of Passo Fundo (Brazil) (2015.07.15 – 2015.12.02)
 José Vieira de Lima, T.O.R. (born Brazil) (1998.11.11 – retired 2008.07.23); previously Bishop of Marabá (Brazil) (1990.04.18 – 1998.11.11)
 Antônio Emidio Vilar, Salesians of Don Bosco (S.D.B.) (born Brazil) (2008.07.23 - 2016.09.28), next Bishop of São João da Boa Vista (Brazil) (2016.09.28 – ...)
 Jacy Diniz Rocha (2017.05.10 – ...), no previous prelature.

Auxiliary bishop
José Afonso Ribeiro, T.O.R. (1979-1988), appointed Prelate of Borba, Amazonas

See also 
 List of Catholic dioceses in Brazil

References

Sources and external links 
 GCatholic.org, with Google photo - data for all sections
 Catholic Hierarchy

Roman Catholic dioceses in Brazil
Roman Catholic Ecclesiastical Province of Cuiabá
Roman Catholic dioceses and prelatures established in the 20th century
Christian organizations established in 1910